Fairview Crossroads (or more commonly Fairview) is an unincorporated community in Surry County, North Carolina,  United States.  Historically, the community was known earliest as Alberty .

Geography
The community is located in Marsh Township and is centered on the intersection of U.S. Highway 601 and North Carolina Highway 268.  Fairview has an elevation of 1,110 feet above sea level.  Area landmarks include Fairview Baptist Church and Fairview cemetery.

References
 

Unincorporated communities in Surry County, North Carolina
Unincorporated communities in North Carolina